Rear Admiral (Retired)   Vijitha Bandara Meddegoda, USP, BA (Defence studies), MBA,[Australia was a senior logistics Officer in the Sri Lanka Navy. He was the former Director General (Budget & Fimance) of Sri Lanka Navy. He was also the former Director Naval (Logistics), Director Naval (Pay & Pension), Director Naval (Budget), Director Naval (Foreign Procurement). Further he hold many key appointments during his career. Rear Admiral Vijitha Meddegoda had retired from his service w.e.f 4 December 2020.

Education
Rear Admiral Vijitha Meddegoda is an old boy of the well-known & distinguished school Nalanda College, Colombo. He joined the General Sir John Kotelawala Defence Academy in 1986 as a cadet officer and on completion of his basic Naval training at the Naval and Maritime Academy, Trincomalee. He was commissioned into the Logistics Branch of the Sri Lanka Navy on 17 June 1988. Subsequently, he followed a Sub Lieutenant Technical course in Sri Lanka and completed his Long Logistics management course in India.

In the academic arena, Rear Admiral Meddegoda has secured many outstanding landmarks. He possesses Master of Business Administration from University of Western Sydney, Australia and Bachelor of Arts (Defence studies) in management from the General Sir John Kotelawala Defence University.

Naval career
Rear Admiral Vijitha Meddegoda, during his Naval career spanning over 34 years, acquired wide and varied experiences. Being an officer in the Logistics branch, Rear Admiral Meddegoda easily counts numerous appointments inclusive of Supply Officer, Staff officer and Commodore Superintendent Logistics Department. Also served in appointments like Director Naval Budget, Director Naval Foreign Procurement, Director Naval (Integrated Logistics Management System), Director Naval (Pay & Pension)& Director Naval Logistics. And also he was served as ‘Naval Secretary’ & Secretary to Commander of the Navy in two occasion (Sep 2014 - July 2015) (Oct 2017-May2018). He was the former Director General (Budget & Finance). He retired from his service on 4 December 2020.

Decorations and medals
Rear Admiral Vijitha Meddogoda's distinguished, decorative and unblemished Naval career has been rewarded on several occasions. In recognition of his competent and valiant performance as a naval officer he has been recipient of Uttama Seva Padakkama, Sri Lanka Navy's 50th Anniversary Medal, Sri Lanka Armed Services Long Service Medal, 50th Independence Anniversary Commemoration Medal, North and East Operational Medal, Purna Bhumi Padakkama and Riviresa Campaign Service Medal. He has also been commended Six times in his career by the Commander of the Navy, for outstanding performance of duty, professional competency and exceptional contributions to the Naval Service.

He is a good sportsman and presently the Sri Lanka Navy Taekwondo Chairman.

Family
Vijitha is married to Shiranthi Wijesekara in 1994 who is working as a Senior Banking Officer in Canada..

References

 Commander of the Navy meets Secretary to the Ministry of Finance
 DIMO delivers the first batch of vehicles to Ministry of Defence
 DIMO Delivers The First Batch Of Vehicles To Ministry Of Defence
 50 senior sailors receive interest-free loans
 Director General (Budget & Finance)of Sri Lanka Navy
 Sri Lanka Navy’s second AOPV arrives at Colombo harbour

Sri Lankan Buddhists
Alumni of Nalanda College, Colombo
Naval and Maritime Academy graduates
Living people
1965 births